Piletocera signiferalis, the signiferalis grass moth, is a moth in the family Crambidae. It was described by Hans Daniel Johan Wallengren in 1860. It is found in South Africa, as well as on the Austral Islands (Rapa Island, Rurutu), the Caroline Islands, the Cook Islands, the Ellice Islands, the Loyalty Islands, the Marquesas Islands, the New Hebrides, Fiji, the Society Islands (Moorea, Bora Bora, Tahiti, Raiatea) and Tonga.

References

signiferalis
Moths of Africa
Moths of Oceania
Moths described in 1860
Taxa named by Hans Daniel Johan Wallengren